Legong: Dance of the Virgins is a 1935 drama travelogue silent film, one of the last feature films shot using the two-color Technicolor process, and one of the last silent films shot by a major Hollywood studio. It is a drama based on a Balinese native tale, with travelogue elements depicting Balinese culture. Legong and the follow up travelogue drama Kliou, the Killer (considered a lost film) were the last mainstream silent films to be released in the US.

Cast
The cast were entirely native Balinese who only acted in this film.

Poetoe Aloes Goesti as Poutou
Bagus Mara Goesti as Gousti Bagus
Saplak Njoman as Saplak
Njong Njong Njoman as Nyong

Plot
Poutou the daughter of Gousti Bagus is in love with Nyong. She attends a barong dance depicting a mythical struggle between a demon and men but is only interested in Nyong who is also there in the crowd of spectators. Nyong is invited to the home of Gousti Bagus and Poutou the next day. He is on his way when he sees Poutou's sister Saplak bathing and is smitten. Nyong writes on a leaf for Saplak to meet him during the temple dance (Legong) Potou is to dance at. It is to be her last temple dance and Potou is very happy until she finds the note and learns of the betrayal. She goes to the bridge and sees the pair together and commits suicide. Gousti Bagus puts her body in a funeral pyre and burns it so she may be reincarnated.

Production

Legong was an American exploitation film (of a type often referred to as a "goona-goona epic") similar to Isle of Paradise (1932), directed by Charles Trego, and Goona Goona or Love Powder (1932) directed by Andre Roosevelt and Armand Denis. Legong was produced and directed by Gaston Glass and Henry de la Falaise for Falaise's wife Constance Bennett's  Bennett Pictures Corporation, and was filmed entirely on location in Bali from May to August 1933, using an all-Balinese cast. The crew was helped by Roosevelt, Denis, and Walter Spies to gain access to local villages and people willing to act in the film.

The cameraman was three-time Academy Award winner color specialist W. Howard Greene, billed as William H. Greene, who also photographed the two-color Technicolor scenes in Ben-Hur (1925), in addition to many other early Technicolor films. Legong was first distributed in the United States in 1935 by DuWorld Pictures Inc. and outside the U.S. by Paramount International. The score was compiled from stock cues from the Abe Meyer library, and was conducted by Samuel Wineland.

Original release

The film opened in New York City on October 1, 1935 at USD$5.00 per ticket ($84.20 in 2012 dollars). Reaction from some New York critics was positive; "exquisitely beautiful" from one, "Moments that touch the heart" from another, and "flaming splendor" from a third. The New York Times' reviewer found it "a pleasant venture in the filmic literature of escape... a pretty tale, and the photoplay recites it simply and with faith. Subduing his color camera to inviting browns and pastel tints, the Marquis sets his native lovers against the rice fields, the shadowy lagoons, the pounding surf and the mountains of that island of which Paul Morand has written that it is absolutely irresistible to college boys and women of 40." Variety, on the other hand, considered it to offer "nothing especially refreshing in the story... follows usual procedure for this type of native stuff" though conceding "A number of elaborate production scenes with oriental trappings are made doubly effective through use of color".

Ten weeks later Film Daily reported that Legong was still playing in New York. Part of the appeal was likely the bare-breasted young actresses that appear throughout the film: American censors of the time tended to be more lenient with toplessness in films purporting to be cultural studies, and the women were not white. Legong was successful enough that it was re-released several times. At one time advertisements promoted the film in large letters as "NUDITY WITHOUT CRUDITY: A FILM FOR ALL AUDIENCES!" "Bali... a garden of Eden with dozens of ‘Eves’! See the strange dance of Rongda, the Witch! Romance in the South Seas! Mass Cremation ceremonies!"

While nudity may have been part of the film's appeal, it also received recognition at the time of its release for embodying "many details of anthropological interest, giving a record, in particular, of betrothal custom, traditional dances and mortuary rites." This is only partially true. The script writers, while basing the story on Balinese culture, gave it a decidedly Hollywood treatment. Despite its shortcomings, the film gives an unparalleled view of life in Bali in the 1930s.

In the course of the story there are several authentic performances of Balinese dance. One of these dances is "Legong", from which the film gets its name. While the film shows the traditional gamelan accompanying the dancers, there is no gamelan music in the original music track. This silent film has a musical soundtrack but no dialogue—rather it uses intertitles written by Hampton del Ruth.

The film was heavily edited in both the US and UK. In the US they removed a lot of the nudity while in the UK they removed the cockfighting scenes. The entire film has been found intact however.

Restoration and new musical score

The film was restored by the UCLA Film and Television Archive in 1999 and released on DVD in 2004. Legong was reconstructed using three surviving nitrate two-color Technicolor prints, one each from the United States, Canada, and the United Kingdom. Scenes of nudity had been trimmed from the U.S. print, while shots of cockfighting had been removed from the British print. The DVD release includes an alternative soundtrack composed by Richard Marriott and I Made Subandi and performed by Gamelan Sekar Jaya and Club Foot Orchestra. The new score mixes Balinese and Western musical traditions. The score is quite unique in that it uses heavy violin ostinato with shouting over the top of it during scenes depicting crowds and cockfighting. This mixture of Balinese music with western instruments creates a unique sound. The score took roughly two months to compose though they had six months in advance to prepare. They borrowed heavily from native music such as barong, legong, garuda and bali langjar.

The new score was performed live at showings of the film at the Castro Theatre in San Francisco in May 1999, and at the UC Theater in Berkeley in 2000. There were also performances at the Winter Garden in the World Financial Center in New York City, as part of the Silent Film/Live Music festival in 2000 and 2005. In July 2013 the score was performed again at the Castro Theatre as part of the San Francisco Silent Film Festival.

In November 2004, a DVD of Legong was released with Bennett Pictures' follow-up film, Kliou, the Killer (1936), filmed in Indochina in color.

See also
List of early color feature films

References

External links
 
 "Virgins" From Bali A Beautiful, Rare Treat: review of the 1999 live performance in the San Francisco Chronicle, May 7, 1999
 Peter J. Bloom, Hagedorn, Katherine J.: Essay for the Legong: Dance of the Virgins DVD (PDF; 75 kB) inadvertently left out of the first pressing of the DVD.
 Legong: Dance of the Virgins (PDF) milestonefilms.com
 Balinese Dancers, Orson Welles and the Return of Spider-Man, The New York Times, November 30, 2004

1935 films
1930s color films
1935 romantic drama films
1930s exploitation films
American silent feature films
Films directed by Henri de la Falaise
American romantic drama films
Early color films
Indonesian-language films
Cockfighting in film
Films shot in Indonesia
Films set in Indonesia
1930s English-language films
1930s American films
Silent romantic drama films
Silent American drama films